Ropalidia ornaticeps is an Asian species of paper wasp in the tribe Ropalidiini; no subspecies are listed in the Catalogue of Life.  The recorded distribution for this species includes India through to Indochina, including Vietnam; the type specimens are females, taken from the Khasia Hills and deposited in Oxford and London.

References

External links
 

Vespidae
Hymenoptera of Asia
Insects described in 1900